Vittorio Emanuele Orlando (19 May 1860 – 1 December 1952) was an Italian statesman, who served as the Prime Minister of Italy from October 1917 to June 1919. Orlando is best known for representing Italy in the 1919 Paris Peace Conference with his foreign minister Sidney Sonnino. He was also known as "Premier of Victory" for defeating the Central Powers along with the Entente in World War I. He was also the provisional President of the Chamber of Deputies between 1943 and 1945, and a member of the Constituent Assembly that changed the Italian form of government into a republic. Aside from his prominent political role, Orlando was a professor of law and is known for his writings on legal and judicial issues, which number over a hundred works.

Early life and career
He was born in Palermo, Sicily. His father, a landed gentleman, delayed venturing out to register his son's birth for fear of Giuseppe Garibaldi's Expedition of the Thousand, who had just stormed into Sicily on the first leg of their march to build an Italian nation. 

Orlando taught law at the University of Palermo and was recognized as an eminent jurist. In 1897, he was elected in the Italian Chamber of Deputies for the district of Partinico for which he was constantly reelected until 1925. He aligned himself with Giovanni Giolitti, who was Prime Minister of Italy five times between 1892 and 1921.

Prime Minister
A liberal, Orlando served in various roles as a minister. In 1903, he served as Minister of Education under Prime Minister Giolitti. In 1907, he was appointed Minister of Justice, a role he retained until 1909. He was re-appointed to the same ministry in November 1914 in the government of Antonio Salandra until his appointment as Minister of the Interior in June 1916 under Paolo Boselli.
 
After the Italian military disaster in World War I at Caporetto on 25 October 1917, which led to the fall of the Boselli government, Orlando became Prime Minister, and he continued in that role through the rest of the war. He had been a strong supporter of Italy's entry in the war. He successfully led a patriotic national front government, the Unione Sacra, and reorganized the army. Orlando was encouraged in his support of the Allies because of secret incentives offered to Italy in the London Pact of 1915. Italy was promised significant territorial gains in Dalmatia. Orlando's first act as head of the government was to fire General Luigi Cadorna and appoint the well-respected General Armando Diaz in his place.Marshall, S. L. A. The American Heritage History of World War I. New York. Page 215. He then reasserted civilian control over military affairs, which Cadorna had always resisted. His government instituted new policies that treated Italian troops less harshly and instilled a more efficient military system, which were enforced by Diaz. The Ministry for Military Assistance and War Pensions was established, soldiers received new life insurance policies to help their families in the case of their deaths, more funding was put into propaganda efforts aimed at glorifying the common soldier, and annual paid leave was increased from 15 to 25 days. On his own initiative Diaz also softened the harsh discipline practiced by Cadorna, increased rations, and adopted more modern military tactics which had been observed on the Western Front. All of these had the net effect of greatly increasing the formerly-crumbling army's morale. Orlando's government quickly proved popular among the general population and successfully reconstituted national morale after the disaster of Caporetto, with Orlando even publicly pledging to retreat to "my Sicily" if necessary and resist the Austrian invaders from there, though he was also assured that there would be no military collapse.Wilcox, Vanda. "Italy in the Era of the Great War." Brill. April 2018. Page 204-205.

With the Austro-Hungarian offensive stopped by Diaz at the Second Battle of the Piave River, a lull in fighting ensued on the Italian front as both sides brought up their logistical elements. Orlando ordered an investigation into the causes of the defeat at Caporetto, which confirmed that it was the fault of the military leadership. While he continued to reform the military, he refused demands from both sides of the political aisle calling for mass trials of generals and ministers. The Italian front stabilized enough under his leadership that Italy was able to send hundreds of thousands of troops to the Western Front to buttress their allies while themselves preparing for a major offensive to knock Austria-Hungary out of the war. This offensive materialized in November 1918, the Italians launched the Battle of Vittorio Veneto and routed the Austro-Hungarians, a feat that coincided with the collapse of Austro-Hungarian Army and the end of the First World War on the Italian Front, as well as the end of the Austro-Hungarian Empire. The fact that Italy recovered and ended up on the winning side in 1918 earned for Orlando the title "Premier of Victory."

Paris Peace Conference

He was one of the Big Four, the main Allied leaders and participants at the Paris Peace Conference in 1919, along with U.S. President Woodrow Wilson, French Prime Minister Georges Clemenceau and Britain's Prime Minister David Lloyd George. Although, as prime minister, he was the head of the Italian delegation, Orlando's inability to speak English and his weak political position at home allowed the conservative foreign minister, the half-Welsh Sidney Sonnino, to play a dominant role.

Their differences proved to be disastrous during the negotiations. Orlando was prepared to renounce territorial claims for Dalmatia to annex Rijeka (or Fiume as the Italians called the town) — the principal seaport on the Adriatic Sea — while Sonnino was not prepared to give up Dalmatia. Italy ended up claiming both and received neither, running up against Wilson's policy of national self-determination. Orlando supported the Racial Equality Proposal introduced by Japan at the conference.

Orlando dramatically left the conference early in April 1919. He returned briefly the following month, but was forced to resign just days before the signing of the resultant Treaty of Versailles. The fact he was not a signatory to the treaty became a point of pride for him later in his life. French Prime Minister Georges Clemenceau dubbed him "The Weeper," and Orlando himself recalled proudly: "When ... I knew they would not give us what we were entitled to ... I writhed on the floor. I knocked my head against the wall. I cried. I wanted to die."

His political position was seriously undermined by his failure to secure Italian interests at the Paris Peace Conference. Orlando resigned on 23 June 1919, following his inability to acquire Fiume for Italy in the peace settlement. The so-called "Mutilated victory" was one of the causes of the rising of Benito Mussolini. In December 1919, he was elected president of the Italian Chamber of Deputies, but never again served as prime minister.

Fascism and final years
When Benito Mussolini seized power in 1922, Orlando initially tactically supported him, but broke with him over the murder of Giacomo Matteotti in 1924. After that, he abandoned politics and resigned from the Chamber of Deputies in 1925, until 1935, when Mussolini's march into Ethiopia stirred Orlando's nationalism. He reappeared briefly in the political spotlight when he wrote Mussolini a supportive letter.

In 1944, he made something of a political comeback. With the fall of Mussolini, Orlando became leader of the National Democratic Union. He was chosen as the president of the Chamber of Deputies until 25 September 1945. In 1946, he was elected to the Constituent Assembly of Italy. In 1948 he was nominated senator for life, and was a candidate for the presidency of the republic (elected by Parliament) but was defeated by Luigi Einaudi. He died in 1952 in Rome.

Controversies
Orlando was a controversial figure. Some authors criticize the blunt way he represented Italy at the 1919 Paris Peace Conference, in contrast to his more diplomatic foreign minister Sidney Sonnino. Other authors say that Orlando was connected to the Mafia and mafiosi from beginning to end of his long parliamentary career, but no court ever investigated the issue. A Mafia pentito and state witness, Tommaso Buscetta, claimed that Orlando was himself actually a member of the Mafia, a man of honour. In Partinico, he was supported by the Mafia boss Frank Coppola, who had been deported back to Italy from the US.

In 1925, Orlando stated in the Italian senate that he was proud of being mafioso and intended it to mean a "man of honor" but making no admission of links to organized crime, saying that "if by the word 'mafia' we understand a sense of honour pitched in the highest key; a refusal to tolerate anyone's prominence or overbearing behaviour; ... a generosity of spirit which, while it meets strength head on, is indulgent to the weak; loyalty to friends ... If such feelings and such behaviour are what people mean by 'the mafia', ... then we are actually speaking of the special characteristics of the Sicilian soul: and I declare that I am a mafioso, and proud to be one."

He maintained a strong rivalry with the prominent statesman and party colleague Francesco Saverio Nitti. French Prime Minister Georges Clemenceau and US President Woodrow Wilson criticized his behavior at the Paris Peace Conference.

Works 

Della riforma elettorale, Milano, 1881
 
Le fratellanze artigiane in Italia, Firenze, 1884
Della resistenza politica individuale e collettiva, Torino, 1885
Principi di diritto costituzionale, Firenze, 1889
Principi di diritto amministrativo, Firenze, 1890
 
Teoria giuridica delle guarentigie della libertà, Torino, 1890
 
 
 
 
 
 
 
 
 
 
La giustizia amministrativa, Milano, 1901
Le régime parlamentaire en Italie, Parigi, 1907
Lo Stato e la realtà, Milano, 1911
Discorsi per la guerra, Roma, 1919
Crispi, Palermo, 1923
Discorsi per la guerra e per la pace, Foligno, 1923
Diritto pubblico generale e diritto pubblico positivo, Milano, 1924
Recenti indirizzi circa i rapporti fra diritto e Stato, Tivoli, 1926
L'opera storica di Michele Amari, Milano, 1928
Su alcuni miei rapporti di governo con la Santa Sede, Napoli, 1929
Immunità parlamentari e organi sovrani, Tivoli, 1933
Diritto pubblico generale, Milano, 1940
Scritti vari di diritto pubblico e scienza politica, Milano, 1940
Discorsi parlamentari, Bologna, 2002

References

Further reading
 Albrecht-Carrié, René. "New Light on Italian Problems in 1919" Journal of Modern History 13#4 (1941), pp. 493-516 online
Arlacchi, Pino (1988). Mafia Business. The Mafia Ethic and the Spirit of Capitalism, Oxford: Oxford University Press, 
 Di Scala, Spencer. Vittorio Orlando: Italy. (Haus Publishing, 2010).

Dickie, John (2004). Cosa Nostra. A history of the Sicilian Mafia, London: Coronet, 
Lauren, Paul G. (1988). Power And Prejudice: The Politics And Diplomacy Of Racial Discrimination, Boulder (CO): Westview Press, 
Macmillan, Margaret (2002). Paris 1919: Six Months That Changed the World, New York: Random House, 
 Procacci, Giovanna. "Italy: From Interventionism to Fascism, 1917-1919." Journal of contemporary history 3.4 (1968): 153-176.
Servadio, Gaia (1976). Mafioso. A history of the Mafia from its origins to the present day, London: Secker & Warburg, 
Tucker, Spencer C. & Priscilla Mary Roberts (eds.), (2005). Encyclopedia Of World War I: A Political, Social, and Military History, Santa Barbara (CA): ABC-CLIO

In Italian
Andreotti, Giulio & Vincio Delleani (1982). Visti da vicino (Vol. II), Milan: Rizzoli, 
Fruttero, Carlo & Massimo Gramellini (2010). La Patria, bene o male, Milan: Mondadori,

External links
 

1860 births
1952 deaths
Politicians from Palermo
Historical Left politicians
Democratic Liberal Party (Italy) politicians
Italian Liberal Party politicians 
Prime Ministers of Italy
Italian Ministers of the Interior
Education ministers of Italy
Presidents of the Chamber of Deputies (Italy)
Deputies of Legislature XX of the Kingdom of Italy
Deputies of Legislature XXI of the Kingdom of Italy
Deputies of Legislature XXII of the Kingdom of Italy
Deputies of Legislature XXIII of the Kingdom of Italy
Deputies of Legislature XXIV of the Kingdom of Italy
Deputies of Legislature XXV of the Kingdom of Italy
Deputies of Legislature XXVI of the Kingdom of Italy
Deputies of Legislature XXVII of the Kingdom of Italy
Members of the National Council (Italy)
Members of the Constituent Assembly of Italy
Senators of Legislature I of Italy
Candidates for President of Italy
20th-century diplomats
Italian people of World War I
Academic staff of the University of Palermo